The Battle of Sadhaura was fought between Sikhs and the combined forces of the Sayyids and the Sheikhs in Sadhaura in 1710. The imperial forces were defeated and took refuge behind the city's walls. Banda's forces captured the fort and levelled it to the ground. It resulted in a victory for the Sikhs where Banda Singh Bahadur defeated Osman Khan.

Background
Sadhaura was ruled by Osman Khan, who tortured and killed the Muslim saint Syed Badruddin Shah (also known as Pir Budhu Shah), for helping Guru Gobind Singh in the battle of Bhagnani and for atrocities committed against Hindus where the cows were slaughtered in front of their homes and forbade Hindus and Sikhs from cremating their dead and performing their religious events, which led the Sikhs to march to Sadhaura.

Aftermath
Osman Khan was captured and chastised. Many aggrieved peasants who wanted to revolt against the ruling elites joined the forces of Banda Singh Bahadur and thus, the angry mob revolted with plunder and destruction of town and killed everyone who took shelter in the house of Syed Badruddin Shah. Banda's forces sacked the city and a general massacre of the city inhabitants ensued. Banda Singh Bahadur later appointed his own governor in Sadhaura.

References

Battles involving the Sikhs